Mārcis Ošs (born 25 July 1991) is a Latvian footballer who plays as a central defender for Spartaks Jūrmala.

Club career
On 31 August 2021, he joined Lausanne Ouchy in the Swiss Challenge League on loan.

International career
Ošs was named in Latvia's squad for the 2016 Baltic Cup. He scored his first international goal for his country in a match against Austria on the 19th of November, 2019 in a UEFA 2020 qualification game, which was also a winning goal as match ended 1-0.

Career statistics

International goals
Scores and results Latvia's goal tally first.

Honours

Club
FK Jelgava
Latvian Football Cup (2): 2013–14, 2014–15

International

Latvia
 Baltic Cup (1): 2016

Personal 

 Best defender of 2015 Latvian Higher League

References

External links
 
 

1991 births
Living people
Association football defenders
Latvian footballers
Latvian expatriate footballers
Latvia international footballers
Ekstraklasa players
Latvian Higher League players
Swiss Super League players
FK Auda players
Górnik Zabrze players
FK Jelgava players
FK Spartaks Jūrmala players
Neuchâtel Xamax FCS players
FC Lugano players
FC Stade Lausanne Ouchy players
Latvian expatriate sportspeople in Poland
Expatriate footballers in Poland
Latvian expatriate sportspeople in Switzerland
Expatriate footballers in Switzerland